Rumpelmayer is a surname. Notable people with the surname include:

 Anton Rumpelmayer (1832–1914), also known as Antoine, Austrian-born confectioner
 Viktor Rumpelmayer (1830–1885), Austro-Hungarian architect